Martín Ojeda may refer to:

 Martín Ojeda (footballer, born 1997), midfielder for Boca Unidos
 Martín Ojeda (footballer, born 1998), midfielder for Orlando City SC